Video Gold is a compilation of music videos and clips featuring the singer Olivia Newton-John. They were released on two DVDs separately as Video Gold I and Video Gold II, but there is one issue that unites the two into one.

Contents

Volume I
 
"Deeper Than the Night" (from Totally Hot, 1979)
"A Little More Love" (Version I) (from Totally Hot, 1979)
"Totally Hot" (from Totally Hot, 1979)
"Landslide" (from Physical, 1981)
"Magic" (from'' Xanadu OST, 1980)
"Physical" (from Physical, 1981)
"Carried Away" (from Physical, 1981)
"A Little More Love" (Version II) (from Totally Hot, 1979)
"Recovery" (from Physical, 1981)
"The Promise (The Dolphin Song)" (from Physical, 1981)
"Love Make Me Strong" (from Physical, 1981)
"Stranger's Touch" (from Physical, 1981)
"Make a Move on Me" (from Physical, 1981)
"Falling" (from Physical, 1981)
"Silvery Rain" (from Physical, 1981)
"Hopelessly Devoted to You" (from Grease OST, 1978)
"Let Me Be There" (Live) (from Let Me Be There/Music Makes My Day, 1973)
"Please Mr. Please" (Live) (fromHave You Never Been Mellow, 1975)
"If You Love Me, Let Me Know" (Live) (from If You Love Me, Let Me Know, 1974)

Volume II

"Twist of Fate" (from Two of a Kind OST, 1983)
"Take A Chance" (from Two of a Kind OST, 1983)
"Livin' in Desperate Times" (from Two of a Kind OST, 1983)
"Shaking You" (from Two of a Kind OST, 1983)
"Heart Attack" (from Greatest Hits Vol. 2, 1982)
"Tied Up" (from Greatest Hits Vol. 2, 1982)
"Soul Kiss" (from Soul Kiss, 1985)
"Culture Shock" (from Soul Kiss, 1985)
"Emotional Triangle" (from Soul Kiss, 1985)
"Toughen Up" (from Soul Kiss, 1985)
"The Right Moment" (from Soul Kiss, 1985)
"The Rumour" (from The Rumour, 1988)
"Can't We Talk It Over in Bed" (from The Rumour, 1988)
"Reach Out For Me" (from Warm and Tender, 1990)
"I Need Love" (from Back to Basics: The Essential Collection 1971–1992, 1992)
"I Honestly Love You '98" (from Back with a Heart, 1998)
"Sam" (Live) (from Don't Stop Believin', 1976)
"Suddenly" (Live) (from Xanadu OST, 1980)
"You're the One That I Want" (Live) (from Grease OST, 1978)
"Xanadu" (Live) (from Xanadu OST, 1980)

Certifications

References

Olivia Newton-John video albums
Music video compilation albums
2005 video albums
2005 compilation albums